The Tower of the Winds is the prominent octagonal tower on top of the old Radcliffe Observatory building in Oxford, England. The building now forms a centrepiece for Green Templeton College, one of the colleges of Oxford University.

The tower is based on the ancient and smaller Tower of the Winds in Athens, Greece, built c.100–50 BC by Andronicus of Cyrrhus for the purpose of measuring time. It is of octagonal stone construction, with eight relief images of Greek mythological wind gods at the top of each side of the tower, carved by John Bacon the Elder in 1792–4. The tower was completed by James Wyatt in 1794. On the top are Atlas and Hercules supporting a globe in white, also by John Bacon. The reliefs of the signs of the zodiac above the windows on the first floor are made of Coade stone by J. C. F. Rossi. Inside the tower, there are three main rooms on top of each other.

The Tower of the Winds is situated in prominent view just to the north of the Radcliffe Observatory Quarter (ROQ), an area for Oxford University departments including the Blavatnik School of Government, and south of Observatory Street, named after its former use as an observatory. To the south is the Mathematical Institute building and Somerville College, juxtaposing the new 21st-century architecture of the buildings with the old 17th-century style of the observatory. To the west is the Jericho Health Centre and beyond that Walton Street, with a view of the tower in the distance from the southern end looking north along the street. To the east are the Woodstock Road and the front entrance of Green Templeton College, with St Anne's College opposite.

See also
 Classical compass winds
 List of wind deities
 Observatory Street, Oxford
 Radcliffe Observatory
 Radcliffe Observatory Quarter
 Tower of the Winds, Athens, Greece

References

1794 establishments in England
Towers completed in 1794
Astronomical observatories in England
Buildings and structures of the University of Oxford
Grade I listed buildings in Oxford
Grade I listed scientific buildings
Green Templeton College, Oxford
Neoclassical architecture in England
Towers in Oxford
James Wyatt buildings
Octagonal buildings in the United Kingdom
Defunct astronomical observatories